Cerithiella antarctica is a species of very small sea snails, marine gastropod molluscs in the family Cerithiopsidae.

References

Cerithiopsidae
Gastropods described in 1912